General elections were held in Northern Rhodesia on 19 February 1954. The result was a victory for the Federal Party, which won 10 of the 12 elected European seats in the Legislative Council.

Campaign
Although Geoffrey Beckett, leader of the elected members in the Legislative Council, had called for the elections to be fought on a non-party basis, the Federal Party voted to contest the elections at a congress held on 6 January. Beckett was prevented from contesting the elections after his nomination papers were rejected by the returning officer after he failed to return his declaration form in time. In Livingstone the local Federal Party selected Llewellyn Oxenham as its candidate, but the party headquarters refused to ratify his nomination, instead nominating Harry Thom, who it was widely thought would stand down if he was elected to allow Beckett to be stand in a by-election. The Ndola branch's selection of its candidate being overruled by the party executive after it was claimed new members had been enrolled and votes had been solicited in the bar of the local railway club where the vote took place.

The Confederate Party opted not to contest the elections, although some members were running as independents.

Results
In mining towns Federal Party candidates defeated independents backed by the European Mineworkers Union and the European Salaried Staff Association. The only two seats in which they were defeated were the Midlands constituency near Lusaka (won by John Gaunt) and Livingstone, where Frank Derby won by 11 votes after the Federal Party vote was split between Oxenham and Thom. Both Derby and Gaunt were members of the Confederate Party. Voter turnout was between 70 and 80% in the mining areas, but lower in other constituencies, and around 60% overall.

By constituency

Aftermath
On 13 January four African members (Robinson Nabulyato from Southern Province, Safeli Chileshe from Central Province, Paskale Sokota from Western Province and Lakement Ngaundu from Northern Province) had been nominated for membership of the Assembly by the Northern Rhodesian African Representative Council from a field of 14 candidates.

See also
List of members of the Legislative Council of Northern Rhodesia (1954–58)

References

1954 in Northern Rhodesia
Northern Rhodesia
Elections in Zambia